The FIA International Championship for Manufacturers (IMC) was a rally series culminating in a champion manufacturer. The championship was run from 1970 to 1972 and it was replaced by the FIA World Rally Championship in 1973. All the nine rallies of the 1972 IMC season were part of the 1973 World Rally Championship season.

In the inaugural season, Porsche's Björn Waldegård drove his 911 S to victory at the Monte Carlo Rally, the Swedish Rally and the Österreichische Alpenfahrt. With Porsche leading Alpine-Renault by only three points before the season-ending RAC Rally, the championship went down to the wire. Alpine-Renault recruited Ove Andersson for the event, but he had an accident and retired. Alpine-Renault's best result was then Andrew Cowan's fifth place, and Porsche took the title. Porsche's Gérard Larrousse also picked up a point for sixth place.

In 1971, Alpine-Renault ran away with the title as Andersson won four of the eight events in the Alpine A110 1600. The Alpine-Renault, driven by Bernard Darniche, also won the last Coupe des Alpes, but because the event ran with an insufficient number of starters (36 when the FIA minimum was 50), no points were awarded towards the championship.

The final IMC title went to Lancia. The Fulvia 1.6 Coupé HF was driven by Simo Lampinen (35 points), Harry Källström (22) Sandro Munari (20) and Amilcare Ballestrieri (20). Fiat finished second in the standings with their 124 Sport Spider.

1970

Events

Final standings

1971

Events

Final standings

1972

Events

Final standings

References

External links

 Official website of the World Rally Championship

Fédération Internationale de l'Automobile
Rally racing series
World Rally Championship